Newsday Media Group was described by The New York Times as "the parent company of the Long Island tabloid" (referring to Newsday). Long Island Business News referred to Media Group's flagship as "Long Island’s only daily newspaper."

Union contracts are with them, rather than with their publications.

History
Newsday Media Group was acquired from the Chicago Tribune by Cablevision in 2008. Following when Altice purchased Cablevision in 2016, Newsday Media Group was reverted to its prior ownership.

In 2019, they sold their AM New York Metro holdings to Schneps Media.

Controversy
Online postings that didn't reflect favorably were deleted as part of ownership transition.

In 2004, they "admitted Thursday that it had substantially overstated its daily and Sunday circulation."

References

Newspaper companies of the United States